Rotimi is a name of Yoruba origin which means "stay with me". It is also a diminutive of names such as Olarotimi (wealth stays with me), Aderotimi (crown/royalty stays with me), Olurotimi (God/my lord stays with me), Akinrotimi (warrior/valour stays with me), Ayorotimi (joy stays with me), etc. 

People with the name include

Given name and/or stage name
Rotimi (actor) (born 1988), American singer-songwriter, actor and model
DJ Xclusive (Rotimi Alakija) (b. 1980), British-Nigerian disc jockey, record producer and recording artist
Rotimi Adebari (born 1964), Nigerian-born Irish politician
Rotimi Akeredolu (born 1956), Nigerian politician
Rotimi Amaechi (born 1965), Nigerian politician
Rotimi Babatunde, Nigerian writer and playwright
Rotimi Fani-Kayode (1955–1989), Nigerian-born British photographer
Rotimi Peters (born 1955), Nigerian sprint runner
Rotimi Rainwater (born 1970), American writer, director, and producer
Frederick Rotimi Williams (1920–2005), Nigerian lawyer
Thanasis Rotimi Antetokounmpo (born 1992), Greek professional basketball player 

Surname
Bunmi Rotimi (born 1995), American football player
Charles Rotimi (born 1957), Nigerian scientist
Christopher Oluwole Rotimi (born 1935), Nigerian general, diplomat and politician
Ola Rotimi (1938–2000), Nigerian playwrights and theatre director
Sunday Rotimi (born 1980), Nigerian football goalkeeper

References 

Yoruba-language surnames
Yoruba given names